Poplar Hill is a historic house in Blaine, Tennessee, U.S.. It was built in 1830 for Cynthia Lea, Major Lea's daughter. Lea grew up at Richland, and she moved into Poplar Hill as soon as she married Elihu Milliken, a Baptist minister. It was later purchased by Willis Idol, a physician.

The house was designed in the Gothic Revival architectural style. It has been listed on the National Register of Historic Places since July 8, 1980.

References

National Register of Historic Places in Grainger County, Tennessee
Gothic Revival architecture in Tennessee
Houses completed in 1830